The Pennywhistlers were an American singing group founded by folklorist and singer Ethel Raim and popular during the 1960s folk music revival. They specialized in Eastern European choral music, sung primarily a cappella. Folk singer Theodore Bikel, in his autobiography Theo, called them "the closest to the real thing in authenticity in the United States." They toured throughout the 1960s, appearing at the Sing Out! hootenanny at Carnegie Hall, the Fox Hollow Festival, and the Mariposa Folk Festival, among others. They shared the bill with performers such as Bob Dylan, Pete Seeger, Joan Baez, Reverend Gary Davis, Leonard Cohen, and many others.

Recordings 
 The Pennywhistlers (Folkways Records FW-8773, 1963)
 The Pennywhistlers: A Cool Day and Crooked Corn (Nonesuch H-72024, 1965)
 The Pennywhistlers: Folksongs of Eastern Europe (Nonesuch H-72007, 1967)
 Songs of the Earth (with Theodore Bikel) (Elektra)

References

External links
Ethel Raim at the Association for Cultural Equity website

American vocal groups
A cappella musical groups
American folk musical groups
Musical groups established in the 1960s